Hammersmith and Fulham London Borough Council is the local authority for the London Borough of Hammersmith and Fulham in London, England. The council is elected every four years.

Political control

Since the first elections to the council in 1964 political control of the council has been held by the following parties:

Leadership
The leaders of the council since 1965 have been:

Council elections
 1964 Hammersmith London Borough Council election
 1968 Hammersmith London Borough Council election
 1971 Hammersmith London Borough Council election
 1974 Hammersmith London Borough Council election
 1978 Hammersmith London Borough Council election (boundary changes reduced the number of seats by ten)
 1982 Hammersmith and Fulham London Borough Council election
 1986 Hammersmith and Fulham London Borough Council election
 1990 Hammersmith and Fulham London Borough Council election
 1994 Hammersmith and Fulham London Borough Council election (boundary changes took place but the number of seats remained the same)
 1998 Hammersmith and Fulham London Borough Council election (boundary changes took place but the number of seats remained the same)
 2002 Hammersmith and Fulham London Borough Council election (boundary changes reduced the number of seats by four) 
 2006 Hammersmith and Fulham London Borough Council election
 2010 Hammersmith and Fulham London Borough Council election
 2014 Hammersmith and Fulham London Borough Council election
 2018 Hammersmith and Fulham London Borough Council election
 2022 Hammersmith and Fulham London Borough Council election (boundary changes increased the number of seats by four)

Borough result maps

By-election results

1964-1968
There were no by-elections.

1968-1971

1971-1974
There were no by-elections.

1974-1978

1978-1982

1982-1986

1986-1990

1990-1994

The by-election was called following the resignation of Andrew Robathan.

The by-election was called following the resignation of Kenneth Burlton.

The by-election was called following the death of Rosemary Belhaven.

The by-election was called following the resignation of Bridget Prentice.

The by-election was called following the resignation of Vivienne Lukey.

The by-election was called following the resignation of Terence McGrath.

The by-election was called following the resignation of Hilda McCafferty.

1994-1998

The by-election was called following the resignation of Antony Glover.

The by-election was called following the resignation of Guy Mortimer.

The by-election was called following the death of Jonathan Maiden.

The by-election was called following the resignation of Iain Coleman.

1998-2002

The by-election was called following the resignation of Mark Simonds.

2002-2006

The by-election was called following the disqualification of Stephen Hamilton.

The by-election was called following the death of Caroline Donald.

2006-2010

The by-election was called following the resignation of Jeanette Bentley.

The by-election was called following the death of Antony Lillis.

2010-2014

The by-election was called following the resignation of Stephen Greenhalgh.

The by-election was called following the death of Jean Campbell.

2014-2018

2018-2022

The by-election was called following the resignation of Alan de'Ath, after taking up a politically sensitive job.

The by-election was called following the death of Cllr. Colin Aherne.

References

By-election results

External links
Hammersmith and Fulham Council